Bring on the Girls is a 1945 American musical comedy film starring Eddie Bracken, Sonny Tufts and Veronica Lake. It is loosely based on the 1940 French comedy The Man Who Seeks the Truth.

Plot
Wealthy Jay Newport Bates breaks off an engagement after discovering his fiancée is a gold digger. He joins the Navy anonymously but his family insist he be chaperoned by Phil North.

While on leave in Miami, Jay meets cigarette girl Teddy Collins, who once was engaged to Phil. When Teddy learns Jay is rich she flirts with him and he falls for her. Phil thinks Jay's new girl is Sue Thomas, a singer at the club.

Cast

Production
The film was from the writers of the Bing Crosby musical Dixie. It marked Veronica Lake's return to the screen after an absence of several months, during which she had lost a child and been divorced. It was her first proper musical, although she had sung in This Gun for Hire and Star Spangled Rhythm.

Her original co-stars were to be Eddie Bracken and Dick Powell. Eventually Powell was replaced by Sonny Tufts.

Filming started in January 1944.

According to Diabolique magazine "After the debacle of The Hour Before Dawn and the traumas of her private life, Lake was carefully protected in this film – not given too much action, not having to carry the bulk of the plot, being cast in a role which is the variation of the one she played in I Wanted Wings – to wit, a gold-digging night club girl (though Lake doesn’t sing)."

Songs
Egyptian Ella

References

External links
 
 
 
 
 Review of film at The New York Times
 Review of film at Variety

1945 films
American musical comedy films
1940s English-language films
Films directed by Sidney Lanfield
Films scored by Robert Emmett Dolan
Paramount Pictures films
American remakes of French films
1945 musical comedy films
1940s American films